The Hood Internet is an American record production duo based in Chicago, Illinois, specializing in mashups. It is composed of Aaron Brink (ABX) and Steve Reidell (STV SLV).

History
In 2007, the Hood Internet started posting the mashup tracks to their website. New York categorized the duo's mashup track of Chris Brown and A. C. Newman, titled "Drug Drug Kiss Kiss", in the "lowbrow" and "brilliant" quadrant of their Approval Matrix in 2007.

The Hood Internet produced BBU's "Please, No Pictures", which was included in BBU's Bell Hooks mixtape in 2012. The duo entirely produced Max B and Isaiah Toothtaker's Toothy Wavy. It was released on Mishka in May 2012.

Their first album of original material, titled FEAT, was released on Decon in September 2012. It featured guest appearances from Class Actress, Cadence Weapon, Tobacco, Hooray for Earth, Sims, and Kleenex Girl Wonder, among others. The remix album, FEAT Remixes, was released in December 2012.

Steve Reidell is also a member of Air Credits along with rapper Showyousuck. Their debut album, Broadcasted, was released in 2016.

Album Tacos
They are also the creators of the Tumblr blog named Album Tacos. The website combines iconic album covers with images of tacos and/or references to tacos. On June 20, 2011, it was listed by Phoenix New Times as Tumblr of the Week.

Discography

Studio albums
 FEAT (2012)

Remix albums
 The Hood Internet (2011)
 FEAT Remixes (2012)
 II (2015)

EPs
 Out of the Ordinary (2014)

Singles
 "Chi City" b/w "Tonight Is Enough" (2010)

Mixtapes

Productions
 BBU - "Please, No Pictures" from Bell Hooks (2012)
 Max B & Isaiah Toothtaker - Toothy Wavy (2012)
 Sole - "Gangster of Love" from No Wising Up No Settling Down (2013)
 Kleenex Girl Wonder - "W.S." from The Comedy Album (2016)

References

External links
 Official website

American hip hop DJs
Remixers
Record production teams
American musical duos
Musical groups established in 2007
Hip hop duos
American mashup groups